United Nations Security Council resolution 1206, adopted unanimously on 12 November 1998, after recalling all resolutions on the situation in Tajikistan and along the Tajik-Afghan border, the Council extended the mandate of the United Nations Mission of Observers in Tajikistan (UNMOT) for a further six months until 15 May 1999.

In Tajikistan there were moves to implement the peace accords and a maintenance of the ceasefire. The Tajik government and United Tajik Opposition (UTO) were in close contact in an attempt to resolve the crisis. The Council noted that the security situation in parts of the country remained precarious and there were delays in establishing the facts surrounding the murder for four members of UNMOT–a Japanese civil affairs officer, Polish and Uruguayan Majors and a Tajik interpreter–in July 1998.

The resolution condemned recent fighting in the Khujand area and the parties were called upon to implement the General Agreement and to create conditions to facilitate the holding of elections. The murders of UNMOT personnel were also strongly condemned and the completion of the investigation by the Tajik government was essential for the resumption of its activities on the ground. The Council welcomed the contribution of the Commonwealth of Independent States peacekeeping forces. Both parties in Tajikistan were reminded that the commitment of the international community depended on the safety of international personnel.

Finally, the Secretary-General Kofi Annan was asked to keep the Council informed on developments and to report back within three months.

See also
 Tajikistani Civil War
 History of Tajikistan
 List of United Nations Security Council Resolutions 1201 to 1300 (1998–2000)

References

External links
 
Text of the Resolution at undocs.org

 1206
1998 in Tajikistan
 1206
Afghanistan–Tajikistan border
November 1998 events